The Bangladesh National Film Award for Best Lyrics is the highest award for lyrics of film music in Bangladesh.

List of winners

Records and statistics

Multiple wins and nominations
The following individuals received two or more Best Lyricist awards:

See also
 Bangladesh National Film Award for Best Music Director
 Bangladesh National Film Award for Best Music Composer
 Bangladesh National Film Award for Best Male Playback Singer
 Bangladesh National Film Award for Best Female Playback Singer

References

Lyrics